{{Infobox film
| name = Pin
| image = Pin Poster.jpg
| alt = 
| caption = Theatrical release poster
| native_name = 
| director = Sandor Stern
| producer = 
| writer = Sandor Stern
| screenplay = 
| story = 
| based_on = {{Based on|Pin (April 1981)|Andrew Neiderman}}
| starring = 
| narrator = 
| music = Peter Manning Robinson
| cinematography = Guy Dufaux
| editing = Patrick Dodd
| studio = 
| distributor = New World Pictures
| released = 
| runtime = 102 minutes
| country = Canada
| language = English
| budget = 
| gross = 
}}Pin (stylized as PIN...) fully titled as Pin: A Plastic Nightmare is a 1988 Canadian horror film directed by Sandor Stern and starring David Hewlett, Cynthia Preston and Terry O'Quinn. It is based on the novel of the same name by Andrew Neiderman. The film was released direct-to-video in the United States on January 27, 1989.

Plot
Dr. Frank Linden has a life-size, anatomically correct medical dummy in his office which he calls "Pin". Via ventriloquism, Dr. Linden uses Pin to teach his children, Leon and Ursula about bodily functions and how the body works in a way the children can relate to without it being awkward. Dr. Linden's interactions with the children are otherwise cold and emotionally distant, and his ventriloquism act is the only sign of a more warm and playful side to his nature. Unknown to Dr. Linden, Leon is mentally ill and has come to believe that Pin is alive. Due in part to his mother, who discourages Leon from playing outdoors or bringing anyone home, Leon has no real friends and sees Pin as the closest analogue. Leon is further traumatized when he secretly witnesses his father's nurse use Pin as a masturbatory sex doll. From that day on, he hates women with large breasts or who engage in promiscuous behaviour.

Leon and Ursula discuss the sex education they've had, and Ursula admits she is looking forward to being older, as she thinks she will enjoy 'the urge'. The film segues to the point where they are in their teens, and Leon discovers graffiti suggesting Ursula sleeps around. He discovers her in a car with boy who he assaults, and makes her promise never to do this again.  Later she admits to him that she is pregnant, and Leon - via Pin - insists that they tell their father, who performs an abortion on fifteen year old Ursula.

When Leon turns eighteen, Dr. Linden, having come back to retrieve case studies for a speech, catches him having a conversation with Pin (via ventriloquism, which Leon had learned). Realizing the extent of Leon's psychosis and that his son is mentally ill, Dr. Linden takes Pin away to use as a visual aid for a speech with the intention of leaving Pin at the medical school. As Dr. and Mrs. Linden speed to the hall, they get into a car crash caused by either Dr. Linden's recklessness or Pin; the Lindens are both killed instantly. Later, as Ursula sits in the back of a police car, crying, Leon secretly retrieves Pin from the scene.

Leon and Ursula, though grieving and orphaned, enjoy their newfound freedom until Mrs. Linden's sister, Aunt Dorothy, moves in. She encourages Ursula to take a job at the library, which Leon is against. Believing that she is influencing Ursula and after talking it over with Pin, Leon causes Aunt Dorothy to die from a heart attack by using Pin to frighten her. However, Ursula continues to work at the library, where she meets handsome athlete Stan Fraker and falls in love. Meanwhile, Leon takes his fixation with Pin to pathological extremes, first by dressing him in Dr. Linden's clothes and finally fitting him with latex skin and a wig.

Leon believes that Stan is only interested in Ursula's inheritance and that he wants to put Leon in a sanitarium. He invites Stan over under the guise of discussing a surprise birthday party for Ursula. Leon drugs Stan's drink, and when Stan fights back, Leon bludgeons Stan with a wooden sculpture. Following Pin's instructions, he puts Stan in a bag and plans to dump him in the river. Leon is interrupted by a call from Ursula, who says she intends to come home early. Leon quickly hides Stan's body in a woodpile outside the house and cleans up the blood.

To calm her, Leon tells Ursula that Stan is visiting a sick friend out of town; she believes him until she discovers a gift she gave Stan and a wet spot on the carpet. When she confronts Leon, he blames it on Pin, which causes her to run out of the house in hysterics. Leon asks Pin why he would not help him. Pin states that he has never lied to or for him, and that it would be useless to lie anyway because they both have no idea how to. Leon, desperate and out of schemes, blames his motives on Ursula, Pin also pointed out that he was lying again, and that everything was done to satisfy his own selfish motives. Ursula returns with a double-bit axe, which she raises ready to strike; the screen goes white as Leon screams and cowers.

The police find Stan's body. To their astonishment, he is still alive. Some time later, Ursula and Stan return to the house to visit Pin. Ursula tells Pin that she's going on a trip with Stan. Pin inquires as to whether she's heard from Leon. Ursula replies "No." Pin says that he misses him a great deal. Ursula agrees. As the story ends, it is revealed that Ursula is talking to Leon, who has taken Pin's persona. After Ursula destroyed her brother’s only companion with an axe, Leon had a psychotic break, which left only the dummy’s side of his personality to completely take over. Leon has essentially become Pin, in the flesh.

Cast
 David Hewlett as Leon Linden
 Cynthia Preston as Ursula Linden
 Terry O'Quinn as Dr. Frank Linden
 Bronwen Mantel as Mrs. Linden
 John Pyper-Ferguson as Stan Fraker
 Jonathan Banks as Pin (voice)

 Production 

The film was shot in Montreal, Quebec, Canada, in 1987. Produced by Rene Malo and Pierre David. Directed by Sandor Stern. Stars include David Hewlett, Cyndy Preston, Terry O'Quinn, Bronwen Nantel and John Ferguson.

 Release Pin was released on VHS on May 28, 1989, and DVD on April 24, 2001, in Widescreen Anamorphic.  The DVD has commentary by director Sandor Stern and journalist Ted Newsom.

 Reception 

Janet Maslin of The New York Times called it "a cool, bloodless, well-made thriller with a taste for the quietly bizarre."  Andrew Marshall of Starburst rated it 9/10 stars and wrote, "A low-key psychological horror produced at a time when the genre was swamped with interminable sagas of invincible otherworldly serial killers, Pin is subtle, disturbing, and brilliant."
Charles Tatum from eFilmCritic.com awarded the film a very positive 5 out of 5 stars, praising the film's creepy music score, and direction, as well as Hewlett and Preston's performances.

 Legacy Pin was featured in Fangoria magazine's 101 Best Horror Movies You've Never Seen''.  It has since become a cult film, and a remake, to be directed by Stern, was announced in 2011.

References

External links 
 
 
 
 

1988 films
1988 horror films
1980s psychological thriller films
Canadian horror thriller films
English-language Canadian films
Films about imaginary friends
Films directed by Sandor Stern
Films based on American horror novels
Films shot in Montreal
Mannequins in films
New World Pictures films
1980s English-language films
1980s Canadian films